Tooma may refer to:

Australia
Tooma, New South Wales, village community in Riverina, New South Wales, Australia
Tooma River, river in the Snowy Mountains of New South Wales, Australia
Tooma Dam, the dam on the Tooma River, forming the Tooma Reservoir

Estonia
Tooma, Estonia, village in Jõgeva Parish, Jõgeva County, Estonia
Lake Tooma, lake in Tallinn, Estonia

See also
Toomas